Pachycerosia is a genus of moths in the subfamily Arctiinae. The genus was erected by George Hampson in 1900.

Species
 Pachycerosia bipuncta Hampson, 1900
 Pachycerosia bipunctulata van Eecke, 1927
 Pachycerosia lutulenta Wileman & West, 1928

References

Lithosiini
Moth genera